A Salesian school is an educational institution run by the Roman Catholic Salesian Congregation of Saint John Bosco (or Don Bosco), and one that uses his methods. Salesian schools are dedicated to young people in an educational and formative environment. According to promoters, a Salesian school is a home, church, playground, and school where students find a new way of life, and prepare for their future as good citizens of their country, while being faithful to their own religion.

Culture 
The figure at the center of a Salesian school is Saint John Bosco or Don Bosco, who is also known as "Father, teacher, and friend of the youth." Don Bosco was a 19th-century visionary from Italy who created a system of education for boys and girls from marginalized areas of society. For Don Bosco, "Prevention" meant helping a youth before he or she gets into trouble. Don Bosco's system has three aspects: loving kindness; reason, and religion. These three aspects have been the object of studies by scholars throughout the 20th century.

Salesian schools strive for strict discipline and order, while avoiding any kind of physical punishment, however, in his book The Devil's Advocate - Child abuse and the men in black, author and former Salesian pupil Graham Wilmer MBE, describes the levels of violence he and other pupils suffered at the hands of Salesian priests in Salesian schools in the British Salesian Province.

In Latin America, the Salesians have been a key factor in the formation of national curricula, while helping provide street children with an education. The Salesian school system involves the family, as the system holds that family and background are as important as a student's performance in school. Salesian schools give a lot of importance to Parents Associations and other groups where parents are invited to participate.

Operating in 124 countries, the Salesian system could be viewed as a kind of "globalized" education, imposing the same concepts. Although culture was very important to Don Bosco, he respected local and national identities. What can be considered global is the system itself with Don Bosco at its center, however, every Salesian school keeps its own cultural identity. For these reasons, Salesian schools have been welcomed in 124 countries, even in non-Christian nations.

List of Salesian schools

References

See also 

 Don Bosco School (disambiguation)
 St John Bosco College (disambiguation)